Roy Präger (born 22 September 1971) is a German former football player.

References

1971 births
Living people
German footballers
Germany B international footballers
SC Fortuna Köln players
VfL Wolfsburg players
Hamburger SV players
Bundesliga players
2. Bundesliga players
Association football forwards
People from Teltow-Fläming